A Bum Note and a Bead of Sweat is a live album by Baboon.  It was released in 2001 on Last Beat Records and re-released later that year on The Orchard.  The album was recorded live to 16-track at two shows in early 2000.

The CD also contains a music video (in QuickTime format) for the studio-version of "Closer," which was directed by Dennis Fitzgerald.

Track listing

Personnel
 Andrew Huffstetler – lead Vocals, trombone, floor tom
 Mark Hughes (credited as "Badnwz Hughes") – bass, backing vocals 
 Mike Rudnicki (credited as "Robonicki") – guitar, backing vocals
 Steven Barnett – drums, room evacuator (RE1), and misc.
 Mark Reznicek – floor tom (on "Rise")
 Joshua Dillard – trumpet (on "Bring Me the Head of Jack Skinner")
 Neil Kopp – saxophone (on "Bring Me the Head of Jack Skinner")
 Rob Thomasson – recording
 Ben Yeager – mixing
 John Congleton – mixing
 George Geurin – mastering
 Chris Paluska – layout
 Dennis Fitzgerald – directed "Closer" video

References

Baboon (band) albums
2001 live albums
Albums produced by John Congleton